Lasioglossum vagans, also known as the Lasioglossum (Ctenomia) vagans, is a species of bee in the family Halictidae.

References
 https://www.academia.edu/7390502/AN_UPDATED_CHECKLIST_OF_BEES_OF_SRI_LANKA_WITH_NEW_RECORDS
 http://animaldiversity.org/accounts/Lasioglossum_vagans/classification/#Lasioglossum_vagans
 https://www.itis.gov/servlet/SingleRpt/SingleRpt?search_topic=TSN&search_value=759524
 http://apoidea.myspecies.info/taxonomy/term/6340

Notes

vagans
Insects described in 1857